Guisser is a village and rural commune in Settat Province, Casablanca-Settat, Morocco. According to the 2004 census it has a population of 11,339.

References

Populated places in Settat Province
Rural communes of Casablanca-Settat